I Love You, Period! is the second studio album by Taiwanese singer Pets Tseng. It was released on 2 July 2017, by Linfair Records. It was the most-streamed album in 2017 on MyMusic, the second leading audio streaming platform in Taiwan.

Track listing

Music videos

References

External links
 Linfair Records - 曾沛慈 我愛你 以上 

2017 albums
Pets Tseng albums